John Hodson, d.D. was an Anglican bishop.

He held livings at Louth, Drogheda, Beaulieu, Donagh and Errigal-Trough. He was Dean of Clogher from 1661 to 1667; and Bishop of Elphin from  then until his death on 18 February 1686.

References

Alumni of Trinity College Dublin
Irish Anglicans
1686 deaths
Deans of Clogher
Anglican bishops of Elphin
Year of birth missing